Newport School District No. 56 is a public school district in Pend Oreille County, Washington and serves the town of Newport. The district offers classes from kindergarten to grade 12.

In October 2004, the district has an enrollment of 1,197.

Schools
Newport High School
Sadie Halstead Middle School
Stratton Elementary School
Pend Oreille River School

References

External links
 

School districts in Washington (state)
Education in Pend Oreille County, Washington